Break the Chains may refer to:

 Break the Chains, a 2015 book by Richie Venton
 Break the Chains, the first track on Dream Evil album Evilized